Anna Dániel (July 10, 1908 - September 17, 2003) was a writer, literary historian and teacher born in Budapest, Hungary. For her work, she was awarded the József Attila Prize.

Life 

Anna Daniel graduated from the Pázmány Péter Science University as a French and German teacher, but also taught Hungarian and world literature. She started her teaching career at the Erzsébet School. Her husband was economist Kerékgyártó János (1909-1968).

She published several novels and young adult novels. She wrote for newspapers and translated from French and German. She was a member of the Hungarian Writer Alliance.

Work

Novels 

 Somehow we need to live... (Bp.: Révai, 1933)
 Princess Elisabeth (Bp.: Dante 1938-1944 és Móra Ferenc Könyvkiadó 1992-2012)
 Run who fears (Bp.: Szépirodalmi Könyvkiadó, 1977)
 Teresa's mission (Bp.: Kossuth Kiadó, 1986)

Youth novels 

 Flora (Bp.: Révai, 1931)
 The day of meetings (Bp.: Móra, 1977)
 Accident (Bp.: Móra, 1979)[13] Cseh, lengyel, lett nyelven is.
 The band (Bp.: Móra, 1983)

References 

 A Magyar Köztársasági Érdemrend lovagkeresztje polgári tagozatának kitüntetettjei 2003-ban: Magyar Közlöny 101. sz. 2003. aug. 29.
 Kortárs magyar írók 1945-1997 Enciklopédia Kiadó 1998-2000
 
 
 
 Liget.org

20th-century Hungarian women writers
1908 births
2003 deaths
Hungarian journalists
Hungarian women journalists
Hungarian schoolteachers
Attila József Prize recipients
20th-century journalists
Pázmány Péter Catholic University alumni